Mound Bayou is a city in Bolivar County, Mississippi, United States. The population was 1,533 at the 2010 census, down from 2,102 in 2000. It was founded as an independent black community in 1887 by former slaves led by Isaiah Montgomery. Mound Bayou Historic District is listed on the National Register of Historic Places.

Mound Bayou has a 96.8% African-American majority population in 2020, one of the largest of any community in the United States. The current mayor of Mound Bayou is Leighton Aldridge.

History
Mound Bayou traces its origin to freed African Americans from the community of Davis Bend, Mississippi. Davis Bend was started in the 1820s by planter Joseph E. Davis (elder brother of former Confederate president Jefferson Davis), who intended to create a model slave community on his plantation. Davis was influenced by the utopian ideas of Robert Owen. He encouraged self-leadership in the slave community, provided a higher standard of nutrition and health and dental care, and allowed slaves to become merchants. In the aftermath of the Civil War, Davis Bend became an autonomous free community when Davis sold his property to former slave Benjamin Montgomery, who had run a store and been a prominent leader at Davis Bend. The prolonged agricultural depression, falling cotton prices, flooding by the Mississippi River, and white hostility in the region contributed to the economic failure of Davis Bend.

Isaiah T. Montgomery led the founding of Mound Bayou in 1887 in wilderness in northwest Mississippi. The bottomlands of the Delta were a relatively undeveloped frontier, and blacks had a chance to make money by clearing land and use the profits to buy lands in such frontier areas. By 1900 two-thirds of the owners of land in the bottomlands were black farmers. With the loss of political power due to state disenfranchisement, high debt and continuing agricultural problems, most of them lost their land and by 1920 were landless sharecroppers. As cotton prices fell, the town suffered a severe economic decline in the 1920s and 1930s.

Shortly after a fire destroyed much of the business district, Mound Bayou began to revive in 1942 after the opening of the Taborian Hospital by the International Order of Twelve Knights and Daughters of Tabor, a fraternal organization. For more than two decades, under its Chief Grand Mentor Perry M. Smith, the hospital provided low-cost health care to thousands of blacks in the Mississippi Delta. The chief surgeon was Dr. T.R.M. Howard, who eventually became one of the wealthiest black men in the state.

In 1952, Medgar Evers moved to Mound Bayou to sell insurance for Howard's Magnolia Mutual Life Insurance Company. Howard introduced Evers to civil rights activism through the Regional Council of Negro Leadership which organized a boycott against service stations that refused to provide restrooms for blacks. The RCNL's annual rallies in Mound Bayou between 1952 and 1955 drew crowds of ten thousand or more. During the trial of Emmett Till's killers, black reporters and witnesses stayed in Howard's Mound Bayou home, and Howard gave them an armed escort to the courthouse in Sumner.

Author Michael Premo wrote:
Mound Bayou was an oasis in turbulent times. While the rest of Mississippi was violently segregated, inside the city there were no racial codes ... At a time when blacks faced repercussions as severe as death for registering to vote, Mound Bayou residents were casting ballots in every election. The city has a proud history of credit unions, insurance companies, a hospital, five newspapers, and a variety of businesses owned, operated, and patronized by black residents. Mound Bayou is a crowning achievement in the struggle for self-determination and economic empowerment.

Geography
U.S. Routes 61 and 278 bypass Mound Bayou to the west and lead south  to Cleveland, the largest city in Bolivar County, and north  to Clarksdale.

Demographics

2020 census

As of the 2020 United States Census, there were 1,534 people, 641 households, and 376 families residing in the city.

2010 census
As of the 2010 United States Census, there were 1,533 people living in the city. The racial makeup of the city was 98.0% Black, 0.9% White, 0.1% Asian and 0.1% from two or more races. 0.9% were Hispanic or Latino of any race.

2000 census
As of the census of 2000, there were 2,102 people, 687 households, and 504 families living in the city. The population density was 2,395.1 people per square mile (922.3/km). There were 723 housing units at an average density of 823.8 per square mile (317.2/km). The racial makeup of the city was 98.43% African American, 0.05% Native American, 0.24% Asian, 0.81% White, 0.05% from other races, and 0.43% from two or more races. Hispanic or Latino of any race were 0.38% of the population.

There were 687 households, out of which 38.4% had children under the age of 18 living with them, 24.7% were married couples living together, 43.7% had a female householder with no husband present, and 26.5% were non-families. 24.7% of all households were made up of individuals, and 9.8% had someone living alone who was 65 years of age or older. The average household size was 3.06 and the average family size was 3.66.

In the city, the population was spread out, with 34.7% under the age of 18, 12.9% from 18 to 24, 23.5% from 25 to 44, 19.1% from 45 to 64, and 9.8% who were 65 years of age or older. The median age was 27 years. For every 100 females, there were 78.3 males. For every 100 females age 18 and over, there were 67.6 males.

The median income for a household in the city was $17,972, and the median income for a family was $19,770. Males had a median income of $21,700 versus $18,988 for females. The per capita income for the city was $8,227. About 41.9% of families and 45.6% of the population were below the poverty line, including 58.5% of those under age 18 and 34.5% of those age 65 or over.

Education

Primary and secondary schools
The city of Mound Bayou is served by the North Bolivar Consolidated School District, which operates I.T. Montgomery Elementary School in Mound Bayou and Northside High School in Shelby. The elementary school is named after Mound Bayou cofounder Isaiah T. Montgomery.

From its earliest years, Mound Bayou has struggled with inadequate educational infrastructure. According to a 1915 report in the Cincinnati Labor Advocate, Mound Bayou's school was attended by more than 300 students who were forced to make use of equipment held to be "inadequate for 50 pupils". Teachers at the school were "poorly paid" and the school year limited to only five months.

On July 1, 2014, the North Bolivar School District consolidated with the Mound Bayou Public School District to form the North Bolivar Consolidated School District. John F. Kennedy Memorial High School in Mound Bayou, formerly the secondary school of the Mound Bayou district, closed in 2018.

St. Gabriel Mission School in Mound Bayou was of the Roman Catholic Diocese of Jackson (formerly Roman Catholic Diocese of Natchez and Roman Catholic Diocese of Jackson-Natchez). It opened as a K-8 school on September 7, 1954. The high school opened in 1958. In 1961 the high school closed. Its non-preschool grades ended in 1994 when it was converted into a preschool. The preschool closed in 2001.

Colleges and universities
Bolivar County residents have residency for two community colleges: Coahoma Community College and Mississippi Delta Community College. Their main campuses respectively are in unincorporated Coahoma County and Moorhead in Sunflower County.

Health care
The last hospital in town closed in 1983.

A branch of Delta Health Center is located in Mound Bayou.  Founded in Mound Bayou in 1967, Delta Health Center was the first rural community health center in the United States.

Notable people

Born in Mound Bayou
Mary Booze, first African-American woman to sit on the Republican National Committee, 1924 to her death in 1948; born in Mound Bayou in 1877, daughter of the founder I.T. Montgomery
General Crook, musician
Lorenzo Gray, baseball player
Katie Hall, U.S. Representative from Indiana from 1982 to 1985 introduced the legislation for MLK day holiday.
Kevin Henry, football player
Russell Holmes, Massachusetts state representative (6th Suffolk)
Melvin "Mel" Reynolds, disgraced politician
Kelly Miller Smith, Sr., preacher, author, and civil rights leader

Lived or worked in Mound Bayou
Isaiah Montgomery, town founder
Medgar Evers, civil rights leader
Myrlie Evers-Williams, widow of Medgar Evers; civil rights leader, journalist, NAACP Chair; delivered invocation at Barack Obama's second inauguration
Fannie Lou Hamer, civil rights leader
T. R. M. Howard, leader of civil rights and fraternal organizations, entrepreneur and surgeon
Harold Robert Perry, first African-American to serve as a Catholic bishop in the 20th century; former pastor at St. Gabriel's Church in Mound Bayou
Lewis Ossie Swingler, journalist, editor, and newspaper publisher
Ed Townsend, singer, songwriter, producer, and attorney
Minnie L. Fisher, local community activist

Cultural references
Ed Townsend wrote the Marvin Gaye hit song "Let's Get It On" in Mound Bayou.

Further reading
 
  David and Linda Royster Beito, T.R.M. Howard: Doctor, Entrepreneur, Civil Rights Pioneer (Oakland: Independent Institute), 2018. .

References

External links
 City of Mound Bayou

Cities in Mississippi
Cities in Bolivar County, Mississippi
Populated places established in 1887
1887 establishments in Mississippi
Populated places in Mississippi established by African Americans